"I'm Satisfied with You" is a song by Hank Williams. It was released in 1954 as a single via MGM Records.

Background
The song was composed by Fred Rose and released as a posthumous single in 1954. The track dates back to Williams' second recording session for MGM Records on August 4, 1947, and much like the Rose's "Fly Trouble" (recorded at the same session), it has a more sophisticated, "uptown" sound than the gritty honky tonk sound Hank would become famous for. Perhaps this may be the reason it was held back, but, after Hank's death on New Year's Day 1953, the track became of paramount importance, considering the demand for material by the late singer had not flagged. In addition, while many of the new recordings the label issued under his name were mostly overdubs, demos, or scratchy radio recordings it had obtained the rights to, "I'm Satisfied with You" boasted a full backing band, including Sammy Pruett, who played on many of Williams' most successful cuts.

References

1954 singles
Hank Williams songs